Mabra eryxalis is a moth in the family Crambidae. It was described by Francis Walker in 1859. It is found on the Chagos Archipelago and Sumatra, as well as in China, Taiwan, Mayotte, Réunion, Sri Lanka and Australia, where it has been recorded from Queensland.

The forewings are yellow with several dark lines, as well as a dark smudge.

References

Moths described in 1859
Pyraustinae